Five Seasons of Angel is a 2004 academic publication relating to the fictional Buffyverse established by TV series, Buffy and Angel.

Book description

Characters and themes in Angel are examined in a collection of essays by a variety of writers, including a horror author, a sex expert, a television critic, a science fiction novelist, and Buffy writer Nancy Holder.

Contents

External links
Phil-books.com - Review of this book
Darkworlds.com - Review of this book

Books about the Buffyverse
2004 non-fiction books
BenBella Books books